Tommy "The Duke" Morrison (January 2, 1969 – September 1, 2013) was an American professional boxer and mixed martial artist who competed from 1988 to 2009, and held the WBO heavyweight title in 1993. He retired from boxing in 1996 when he allegedly tested positive for HIV. Morrison is also known for his acting career, having starred alongside Sylvester Stallone in the 1990 film Rocky V as Tommy Gunn.

Morrison had previously attempted a comeback to boxing in 2007 when the Nevada commission lifted the indefinite worldwide suspension in July 2006. Though his comeback in boxing was shortlived, Morrison briefly dabbled as a mixed martial artist from 2007 to 2009 in unsanctioned fights.

In August 2013, Morrison's mother announced that her son was in the final stages of AIDS, and he died on September 1, 2013 at the age of 44 from sepsis, septic shock, multi-system organ failure and, ultimately, cardiac arrest.

Early life and amateur career
Morrison was born in Gravette, Arkansas. His mother, Diana, was Native American (half Ponca and half Otoe) whereas his father Tim was of  Irish  ancestry. Morrison was raised in Delaware County, Oklahoma, spending most of his teenage years in Jay. His nickname, "The Duke", is based on the claim that he was a grand-nephew (or otherwise distant relative) of the Hollywood star John Wayne (né Marion Morrison). Tommy's father urged him to take up boxing at age ten. When Tommy was 13 years old, his mother used a fake ID and entered her son into 15 "toughman" contests (the minimum age for contestants was 21). He later told The New York Times that he lost only one of these matches.

After graduating from high school in 1988, Morrison received a football scholarship to Emporia State University. In the same year, Morrison won the Regional Heavyweight Title – Kansas City Golden Gloves from Donald Ellis and advanced to the National Golden Gloves in Omaha, Nebraska, where he decisioned Javier Alvarez in the preliminaries, decisioned Warren Williams in the quarterfinals, but lost a split decision to Derek Isaman in the semifinals. Two weeks later, Morrison took part in the Western Olympic trials in Houston, Texas, defeating Robert Hargrove by a 4–1 majority decision in the semifinals, and John Bray by a 5–0 unanimous decision in the finals, and qualifying for the nationals, and garnering the "Outstanding Fighter" award of the tournament. Two weeks after that, fighting out of Republic, Missouri, at the National Olympic Trials in Concord, California, July 6, 1988, Morrison lost a 0–5 unanimous decision to Ray Mercer, who went on to win the gold medal at the Seoul Olympics. (They also had a prior match-up scheduled to be held June 16, 1988, at the Felt Forum, New York City, but no further information is available as to why it did not happen.)

As an amateur, Morrison claimed 222 fights (most of which were local match-ups), with the 1988 Olympic Trials being the top of his amateur career. His amateur record is 202 wins, 20 losses.

Professional career

Early career 
Morrison started his professional boxing career on November 10, 1988, with a first-round knockout of William Muhammad in New York City. Three weeks later, he scored another first-round knockout. In 1989, Morrison had 19 wins and no losses, 15 by knockout. That same year, actor Sylvester Stallone observed one of Morrison's bouts. Stallone arranged a script reading and cast Morrison in the movie Rocky V as Tommy "The Machine" Gunn, a young and talented protege of the retired Rocky Balboa. Morrison took a six-month break from boxing to work on the movie in 1990. From December 8, 1989 until June 8, 1990, Morrison did not compete in a boxing match. That was due to both injuries and his involvement in the movie Rocky V. In 1991, Morrison won four bouts, including notable victories against opponents James Tillis, the first man to take Mike Tyson the distance, and former WBC heavyweight champion Pinklon Thomas.

Morrison vs Mercer 
Morrison was then given an opportunity to face fellow undefeated fighter Ray Mercer, the WBO title holder in a Pay Per View card held on October 18, 1991. The fight was a matchup between two undefeated, up-and-coming heavyweights. Initially, the bout was set to take place on August 9, but Morrison had to withdraw after suffering a deep cut while sparring. Mercer contemplated facing a substitute opponent, but it was announced the following week that fight would be rescheduled for October 18.

Morrison got off to a great start, outboxing a sluggish Mercer through the first three rounds en route to taking all three rounds on all three of the judge's scorecards. Mercer would end the fight only 28 seconds into the fifth round. With Morrison backed up into the corner, Mercer was able to land a 15–punch combination. Clearly hurt from the exchange, Morrison slumped against the ropes, but the referee allowed Mercer to land several more punishing blows to a now defenseless Morrison before finally ending the fight. Morrison suffered the first loss of his career, losing by 5th-round knockout.

Career from 1991-1993 
He had six wins in 1992, including fights with Art Tucker and Joe Hipp, who later became the first Native American to challenge for the world heavyweight title. In the Hipp fight, held June 19, 1992, Morrison was suffering from what was later discovered to be a broken hand and broken jaw, but rallied to score a knockout in the ninth round.

WBO heavyweight champion

Morrison vs Foreman 
After two wins in 1993, including one over two-time world title challenger Carl "The Truth" Williams, Morrison found himself fighting for the WBO title again, against heavyweight boxing legend George Foreman. Though the bout was promoted as a match between two of boxing's hardest punchers, neither fighter scored a knockdown nor had their opponent in any real danger. Morrison chose to avoid brawling with Foreman and spent the fight boxing from long range. He was able to hit and move effectively in this manner. Morrison won the bout in a lopsided unanimous decision with two scores of 117–110 and one score of 118–109, which resulted in him becoming the new WBO Heavyweight champion in the process.

Morrison vs Tomashek 
Originally, Morrison's first title defense was scheduled scheduled against his Rocky V co-star Mike Williams in August 1993. Williams ultimately withdrew on the night of the fight, so Tim Tomashek stood in as a replacement. Although Tomashek had been prepared to fight as a backup plan, some news reports created the impression that he had just been pulled out of the crowd. Tomashek had been drinking before the bout, not believing Williams to have really backed out, yet still was able to reel off several of Morrison's combinations. The fight was stopped by Tomashek's corner after only four rounds due to him walking to the wrong corner after he was knocked down by Morrison. The WBO was later said to have rescinded their sanctioning of this fight due to Tomashek's lack of experience, but this was later confirmed to been a rumor as fight records show the fight to have remained a bonafide title bout.

Morrison vs Bentt 
Almost immediately, talks of a fight with WBC champion Lennox Lewis began for reestablishing him as one of the top heavyweight contenders. Morrison then agreed to the lucrative WBC title shot against Lewis, that would see Lewis make the fourth defense of his title against Morrison, with both men evenly splitting a $16 million purse. However, Morrison first chose to take a tuneup bout against the virtually unknown Michael Bentt before facing Lewis. The decision would prove to be unwise as Bentt brutalized Morrison during their fight, knocking him down three times 97 seconds into the first round in front of a live HBO Boxing audience, after which the fight was stopped and Bentt was named the winner. The loss cost Morrison his title shot against Lewis, as well as a reported $7.5 million that he was to earn in the Lewis fight.

Career from 1994-1996 
Morrison recovered by winning three bouts in a row in 1994, but his last fight of the year, against Ross Puritty, ended with a draw, before he landed a WBO heavyweight title fight against Herbie Hide on the infamous "High Noon in Hong Kong" card, but the event was cancelled at the last minute due to financial issues. Morrison won three fights in 1995 before meeting former #1 contender Razor Ruddock for the minor IBC heavyweight title.

Morrison vs Ruddock 
Ruddock dropped Morrison to his knees in the first round, but Morrison recovered to force a standing count in round two and compete on even terms for five rounds. Both fighters continued to trade power punches in rounds three and four, but Ruddock took control in round five, hurting Morrison with several left hooks and keeping him at bay with his jab. In the sixth round, Ruddock hurt Morrison with a quick combination, but just as it seemed Morrison was in trouble, he countered with a tremendous hook that put Ruddock on the canvas. Ruddock regained his feet, but Morrison drove him to the ropes and showered him with an extended flurry of blows. Just as the bell was about to sound, the referee stepped in and declared Morrison the winner by TKO.

Morrison vs Lewis 
Following his victory over Ruddock, Morrison was scheduled to meet former Undisputed Heavyweight Champion Riddick Bowe for Bowe's WBO Heavyweight title, but Bowe pulled out after obtaining a more lucrative fight with Evander Holyfield. Shortly after the cancellation of the Bowe–Morrison fight, Lewis and Morrison were able to reach an agreement to face one another during the fall of 1995 in Atlantic City, New Jersey. The much-anticipated fight with Lewis, who had also lost his world championship, had finally took place. Morrison was knocked out in the sixth round. Both fighters fought a conservative first round with neither man establishing much power-wise, but Lewis was able to effectively and efficiently use his signature left-jab to keep Morrison on the defensive and had little trouble with Morrison from the second round onwards.

Retirement 
In February 1996, in the hours before a scheduled bout against Arthur Weathers, the Nevada Athletic Commission determined that Morrison had tested positive for HIV, suspending Morrison from boxing in Nevada. Several days later, Morrison's physician administered a test, which was also positive. At a news conference on February 15, 1996, Morrison said he had contracted HIV because of a "permissive, fast and reckless lifestyle." Morrison stated that he would "absolutely" never fight again.

At another news conference on September 19, 1996, in Tulsa, Oklahoma, Morrison announced he wished to fight "one last time" when he could find an opponent, the proceeds of which would benefit his KnockOut AIDS Foundation. A spokesman for the Oklahoma Professional Boxing Advisory Board said Morrison would probably not be permitted to fight in Oklahoma because of his Nevada suspension. Morrison was given an opportunity for a final bout. By invitation of George Foreman, Morrison traveled to Japan in November 1996, to fight on the undercard, headlined by Foreman himself of his title defense of his Lineal/WBU championship against Crawford Grimsley. Morrison was allowed to fight as anyone who was HIV positive was not prohibited from fighting in the boxing sport within Japan. However the bout was agreed to be stopped if Morrison received a cut. Morrison won against Rhode by TKO, at less than two minutes of the first round.

Comeback 
In 2007, Morrison began fighting again. After passing medical tests in Texas, West Virginia licensed Morrison to fight in that state, so in February 2007 he fought and beat John Castle by a second round knockout. In February 2008, Morrison was cleared to fight Matt Weishaar in Leon, Mexico on the undercard, where standard HIV testing before a match did not exist at such a time, and he defeated him by a third round TKO.

In January 2011, the RACJ, the boxing commission for the province of Quebec, required that Morrison take a supervised HIV test in advance of a scheduled 2011 fight. Morrison invited the Quebec commission to attend a public test, but the commission did not come.   Morrison stated that if Quebec refused to license him, he would "take the dog and pony show somewhere else." Morrison retired again that same year.

Mixed martial arts career 
Morrison announced he would make his MMA debut after he began a comeback in his boxing career. In 2009, days before his final MMA bout, Morrison stated in an interview on MMANews.com that his debut in 2007 was more or less just a favor to his friend, who happened to be the promoter for the event. He voiced respect for the sport and those that participated in it, but he decided to stick with boxing as it was what he knew best, stating he never did or ever intended to make a full transition, despite popular belief.

On June 9, 2007, Morrison got into the cage with John Stover, a 340 pound fighter with a 7-2 record on the undercard fights of World Fighting Championships: Rumble in the Red Rocks. He did not need a license to fight as the location was outside the Arizona state jurisdiction, and Stover agreed to the match when it was shown to him that his opponent was allegedly HIV negative. Though Stover was under restrictions, not able to knee, kick, or grapple, and so Morrison won in the first round by TKO after breaking Stover's nose with an overhand right at just over two minutes of the round. Due to the modified stand-up rules, the fight was to be "not considered a mixed martial arts contest", so was instead to be billed an exhibition fight and did not count towards Morrison's professional MMA record.

In January 2009, Tommy fought in another bout, under modified Muay Thai rules thus marking the fight in the category of MMA, in Laramie, Wyoming against veteran mixed martial artist and boxer Corey Williams, a reigning MMA and Boxing heavyweight champion in the state, as part of the Ultimate Xplosion 12 event. The bout was unsanctioned as the state of Wyoming did not possess an athletic commission at the time. Morrison fought conservatively in the first round for a time, but then knocked out Williams by the end, awarded the victory by KO just under two minutes.

Personal life 
At one point in 1996, Morrison was married to two women at the same time: Dawn Freeman and Dawn Gilbert. Morrison had two children by age 19. Tommy and Trisha Morrison were engaged in 2009 and married in 2011. Morrison is the father of professional boxers Kenzie Morrison and Trey Lippe Morrison.

Health 
In 2006, Morrison said his HIV tests had been false positives. The Nevada commission's medical advisory board reviewed Morrison's 1996 test results and concluded they were "ironclad and unequivocal." Morrison said he tried to get a copy of the original test result but was unable to do so, adding: "I don't think it ever existed." The commission said Morrison could "contact the laboratory, and they would immediately release the results to him."

Morrison tested negative for HIV four times in January 2007. On July 22, 2007, the New York Times reported that Morrison took two HIV tests in 2007 and a third specifically for the Times. Ringside doctors, including Nevada's chief ringside physician, implied that the negative results were not based on Morrison's blood.

Legal issues
In December 1993, Morrison was charged with assault and public intoxication when he allegedly punched a University of Iowa student. Morrison said that the student had been staring at him. Morrison pleaded guilty and paid a $310 fine, but said he was innocent. In October 1996, Morrison pleaded guilty to transporting a loaded firearm in Jay, Oklahoma; he received a 6-month suspended sentence and a $100 fine. In 1997, an Oklahoma jury convicted him of DUI in an accident that left three people injured; the court ordered Morrison to spend time in treatment.

In September 1999, an Oklahoma court gave a two-year suspended sentence for a DUI elevated to felony level by his previous DUI conviction. On September 16, 1999, the police stopped Morrison for driving erratically and found drugs and weapons in his car, which resulted in various drugs and firearms charges. While awaiting trial on the September 16 charges, Morrison was again arrested on charges of intoxication and weapon possession while a felon in November 1999. On January 14, 2000, Morrison was sentenced to two years in prison on the September 16 charges. On April 3, 2002, he was sentenced to another year in prison after violating parole in Tulsa, Oklahoma, but was given credit for time previously served.

Death
In August 2013, Elizabeth Merrill of ESPN.com reported that Morrison's mother, Diana, said that Tommy had "full-blown AIDS" and was "in his final days." She also stated that Morrison had been bedridden for over a year. The same article also stated that Morrison's wife, Trisha, did not believe Morrison had AIDS.

On September 1, 2013, Morrison died at the Nebraska Medical Center in Omaha, Nebraska at the age of 44. According to the Nebraska Department of Health & Human Services, Morrison's cause of death was cardiac arrest, resulting from multiorgan failure due to septic shock caused by a Pseudomonas aeruginosa infection.

Professional boxing record

Mixed martial arts record

Professional

Exhibition

Filmography

References

External links

Tommy Morrison Fight-by-Fight Career Record at About.com

1969 births
2013 deaths
American people convicted of assault
American people convicted of drug offenses
American people of Irish descent
American people of Native American descent
American sportspeople in doping cases
Boxers from Oklahoma
Deaths from sepsis
Deaths from multiple organ failure
Doping cases in boxing
Infectious disease deaths in Nebraska
People from Delaware County, Oklahoma
Sportspeople from Arkansas
World heavyweight boxing champions
World Boxing Organization champions
People from Gravette, Arkansas
American male boxers
Native American boxers